Adriaan van 't Hoff (7 December 1893 – 15 November 1939) was a Dutch painter. His work was part of the painting event in the art competition at the 1928 Summer Olympics.

References

1893 births
1939 deaths
20th-century Dutch painters
Dutch male painters
Olympic competitors in art competitions
Artists from The Hague
20th-century Dutch male artists